Mount Strange is a partly ice-free mountain 4 nautical miles (7 km) east-northeast of Mount Isherwood, standing at the east side of Simmons Glacier in the Kohler Range, Marie Byrd Land. Mapped by United States Geological Survey (USGS) from surveys and U.S. Navy air photos, 1959–66. Named by Advisory Committee on Antarctic Names (US-ACAN) for Joe F. Strange, USGS topographic engineer, member of the Marie Byrd Land Survey Party, 1966–67.

Mountains of Marie Byrd Land